The 2015–16 North West Counties Football League season was the 34th in the history of the North West Counties Football League, a football competition in England. Teams were divided into two divisions: Premier Division and Division One.

Premier Division

The Premier Division featured four new teams:
 Atherton Collieries – promoted from Division One
 Cammell Laird 1907 – promoted from Division One
 A.F.C. Darwen – promoted from Division One
 Padiham – relegated from Northern Premier League Division One North

League table

Promotion criteria
To be promoted at the end of the season a team must:
 Have applied to be considered for promotion by 30 November 2015
 Pass a ground grading examination by 31 March 2016
 Finish the season in a position higher than that of any other team also achieving criteria 1 and 2
 Finish the season in one of the top three positions

The following five clubs achieved criterion 1:
1874 Northwich
Atherton Collieries
Colne
Runcorn Linnets
Runcorn Town

Results

Stadia and Locations
Sources for this subsection: NWCFL web site and the websites of the participating clubs

Division One

Division One featured four new teams:

 Bacup Borough – relegated from Premier Division, and a name change from Bacup & Rossendale Borough
 St Helens Town – relegated from Premier Division
 Stockport Town – new club
 Whitchurch Alport – joined from Mercian Regional Football League Premier Division

One further club had changed its name since the previous season:
 Northwich Manchester Villa – previously known as Northwich Flixton Villa

League table

Playoffs
Source for this subsection: NWCFL results

Results

Stadia & Locations
Sources for this section: NWCFL web site and the websites of the participating clubs

League Challenge Cup
Also called the MEN United Cup for sponsorship reasons.
Sources for this section: NWCFL web site results

First round
Bacup Borough and Rochdale Town received byes to the second round.
Premier Division teams exempt to the second round.

Played Saturday 26 September.

Second round

Ties played 23 and 24 October.

Third round

Ties played 28 November, with four delayed by bad weather.

* played at Ashton
** played at Atherton

Quarter-finals

Ties played on Saturday 27 February.

Semi-finals

Final
Played 10 May at Fleetwood Town's Highbury Stadium

First Division Trophy
Also called the Reusch First Division Cup for sponsorship reasons.
Source for this section: NWCFL web site

First round
Each of the remaining Division One clubs received a bye to the second round.

Ties played Saturday 17 October.

Second round

Ties played 6 and 7 November, with two delayed due to bad weather

*played at Chadderton, following two postponements

Quarter-finals

One tie played 20 February, with three delayed due to bad weather

* Played at Barnton

* Litherland REMYCA disqualified for fielding an ineligible player
** Irlam disqualified for fielding an ineligible player
*** Played at Stockport

Semi-finals

Played on 19 March.

Hanley Town awarded walkover to final

Final

Played on 19 April at Congleton Town's ground

References

External links 
 nwcfl.com (The Official Website of The North West Counties Football League)

North West Counties Football League seasons
9